Powari may mean:
pertaining to the Powar, a Hindu social group
Powari language, spoken in India